The American Football Conference – Eastern Division or AFC East  is one of the four divisions of the American Football Conference (AFC) in the National Football League (NFL). There are currently four teams that reside in the division: the Buffalo Bills (based in Orchard Park, New York); the Miami Dolphins (based in Miami Gardens, Florida); the New England Patriots (based in Foxborough, Massachusetts); and the New York Jets (based in East Rutherford, New Jersey). All four members of the AFC East were previously members of the Eastern Division of the American Football League (AFL).

Both perfect regular seasons in professional football since the adoption of a 14-game schedule in the inaugural AFL season and by the NFL in 1961 have been achieved by teams in this division – the 1972 Dolphins, who completed the only perfect season in professional football at 17–0, and the 2007 Patriots, who finished 18–1 after losing Super Bowl XLII. Since the division's enfranchisement in 1960, with the creation of the AFL, the division has been represented in 22 Super Bowls and won 11 of them. The most recent appearance in the Super Bowl by an AFC East team was the Patriots victory in Super Bowl LIII.

The current champions of the AFC East are the Bills, who won 3 consecutive division titles in 2020, 2021, and 2022. Previously, the Patriots had won eleven consecutively from 2009 through 2019. The Patriots have won the most AFL/AFC East titles, at 22; followed by the Dolphins at 14 and the Bills at 13 (and the 1964 and 1965 AFL titles). The Jets have won four. Two teams formerly in the division combined for ten AFL/AFC East titles – the Houston Oilers (now the Tennessee Titans) won four division titles (and the 1960 and 1961 AFL titles) during the AFL era while the Baltimore–Indianapolis Colts won six division titles (and Super Bowl V) in the 32 seasons they were in the division.

The AFC East teams have won 26 AFL or AFC championships: including 11 by the Patriots, 6 by the Bills, and 5 by the Dolphins. The now-Titans won 2, followed by 1 each by the Jets and Colts.

AFL Eastern Division
The American Football League Eastern Division was formed during the inaugural season of the American Football League in 1960, as a counterpart to the AFL Western Division. The divisional alignment consisted of the Buffalo Bills, Boston Patriots, New York Titans and Houston Oilers. The Miami Dolphins entered the AFL in 1966 as part of its Eastern division.

The division was absorbed nearly intact with the AFL–NFL merger in 1970, but Houston was moved to the AFC Central (formerly the NFL Century Division, now the AFC North) and replaced by the closer Baltimore Colts (from the NFL Coastal Division, which became the NFC West). Despite relocating to Indianapolis, Indiana in 1984, the Colts continued to play in the AFC East until NFL expansion from 31 to 32 teams with the addition of the Houston Texans (successor club in Houston to the Oilers) and 2002 re-alignment when they were moved to the AFC South (the successor franchise to the Oilers, the Tennessee Titans, is also in the AFC South).

Although Miami is farther south than the home cities of the other three teams, all of which are in the Northeast, all four AFC East teams have historical rivalries among them, dating from their years in the AFL during the 1960s. All four teams in this division are based in the Eastern Time Zone.

None of the AFC East teams currently play within the central city of their metropolitan area (in New England's case, they also reflect the region they are based in):
The Bills play in Orchard Park, New York; they played in the city of Buffalo from 1960 to 1972. 
The Jets play in East Rutherford, New Jersey (and share a stadium with the New York Giants; they played in the New York City borough of Manhattan from 1960 to 1963, and in the borough of Queens from 1964 to 1983).
The Dolphins play in Miami Gardens, Florida, a suburb of Miami (Miami Gardens was separated from the city itself and incorporated in 2003). The Dolphins also played in the Miami neighborhood of Little Havana from 1966 to 1986 when they played at the Orange Bowl.
The Patriots play in Foxborough, Massachusetts (they played in Boston, the largest city in New England, until 1970 and adopted their current name in 1971 when they moved into what eventually became known as Foxboro Stadium).

Almost analogously, three out of the four NFC East teams do not actually play within the city of their naming (only the Philadelphia Eagles do so).

All of the teams are or were coached by a first or second generation member of the Bill Parcells coaching tree: the Patriots have Bill Belichick; the Dolphins had Tony Sparano; the Jets had Eric Mangini (who served as an assistant with both Belichick and Parcells); and the Bills had Dick Jauron (fired on November 17, 2009), who served as an assistant with former Parcells assistant Tom Coughlin. The Jets were coached by Todd Bowles (2015–2018) and the Bills were coached by Rex Ryan for 31 games (the entire 2015–16 season, and he was fired before the last game of the 2016–17 season and replaced with interim Head Coach Anthony Lynn). Parcells himself coached the Patriots (1993–96) and the Jets (1997–99) and was Vice President of Football Operations for the Dolphins until the summer of 2010.

ESPN's Chris Berman often calls this division the "AFC Adams" due to its geographical similarity to the old Adams Division of the NHL, now succeeded by the Atlantic Division.

Along with the AFC (formerly AFL) West, the AFC East is the oldest NFL division in terms of creation date (1960).

Division lineups

 Place cursor over year for division champion or Super Bowl team.

Boston Patriots renamed to New England Patriots.
Houston Oilers move to newly created AFC Central division (1970 season) and later are renamed the Tennessee Oilers (1997 season), then Tennessee Titans (1999 season). Moved to AFC South in 2002.
New York Titans renamed to New York Jets (1963 season)
Miami Dolphins enfranchised (1966 season)
Baltimore Colts merge from NFL's Coastal Division (1970 season)
Baltimore Colts relocate to Indianapolis subsequently renamed Indianapolis Colts (1984 season). Moved to AFC South in 2002.

Division champions

 
 + – A players' strike in 1982 reduced the regular season to nine games. Thus, the league used a special 16-team playoff tournament just for this year. Division standings were ignored, Miami had the best record of the division teams.
 ++ – Due to the Week 17 game against the Cincinnati Bengals being declared a no-contest (and later cancelled), the Buffalo Bills officially played 16 games in the 2022 season.

Wild Card qualifiers

 + – A players' strike in 1982 reduced the regular season to nine games. Thus, the league used a special 16-team playoff tournament just for this year. Division standings were ignored, Miami had the best record of the division teams.

Total playoff berths while in the AFL/AFC East
(AFC East records 1960–2021 seasons)
Reflects Colts & Oilers results only while in the East Division.
In the sortable table below, teams can be ordered by name, number of division wins, playoff berths, or titles.

1 Realigned from NFL Coastal in 1970 merger. Known as the Baltimore Colts before 1984. Realigned into the AFC South beginning with the 2002 NFL season.
2 Realigned into the AFC Central in 1970 merger, and into the AFC South in 2002. Known as Tennessee Oilers from 1997 to 1998, and Tennessee Titans since 1999.

Season results

See also
Bills–Dolphins rivalry
Bills–Jets rivalry
Bills–Patriots rivalry
Colts–Patriots rivalry 
Dolphins–Jets rivalry
Dolphins–Patriots rivalry
Jets–Patriots rivalry
AFC East Interdivisional and Interconference Rivals
Bills-Titans rivalry
Broncos-Patriots rivalry
Dolphins-Raiders rivalry
Patriots-Ravens rivalry
Patriots-Steelers rivalry
Buccaneers-Dolphins rivalry
Giants-Jets rivalry
Giants-Patriots rivalry

Notes

References

National Football League divisions
NFL
Buffalo Bills
Indianapolis Colts
Miami Dolphins
New England Patriots
New York Jets
1960 establishments in the United States